Kenny Cox (November 8, 1940 – December 19, 2008) was a jazz pianist performing in the post bop, hard bop and bebop mediums. Cox was pianist for singer Etta Jones during the 1960s and was also a member of a quintet led by trombonist George Bohannon. By the end of the late 1960s he had formed his own Kenny Cox and the Contemporary Jazz Quintet, which recorded two albums for Blue Note Records before the end of the decade. Cox has appeared as a contributor on various albums, and has also performed live with such musicians as Rahsaan Roland Kirk, Eddie Harris, Jackie McLean, Roy Haynes, Ben Webster, Wes Montgomery, Kenny Dorham, Philly Joe Jones, Kenny Burrell, Donald Byrd, Roy Brooks, Charles McPherson, and Curtis Fuller. During the 1980s he formed the Detroit-based Guerilla Jam Band, a group which performed with  Regina Carter, James Carter, Tani Tabbal, and Craig Taborn.  Cox was responsible for the short-lived Strata Records.

He died in his Detroit home of lung cancer at the age of 68.

Discography

As leader
Introducing Kenny Cox (Blue Note, 1968)
Multidirection (Blue Note, 1969)
Location (Strata, 1973)

As contributor
With James Carter
Live at Baker's Keyboard Lounge (Warner Bros., 2001 [2004])
With Etta Jones
Love Shout (Prestige, 1963)
With Others

References

1940 births
2008 deaths
Musicians from Detroit
Post-bop pianists
Hard bop pianists
Bebop pianists
Blue Note Records artists
American jazz pianists
American male pianists
20th-century American pianists
Jazz musicians from Michigan
20th-century American male musicians
American male jazz musicians